Harold Bryce Mortlock , LFRAIA,  (14 October 1921 – 3 July 2004) was an Australian architect and planner, alongside Sydney Ancher, Stuart Murray and Ken Woolley. His career spanned the era which saw the consolidation of modern Australian architecture.

His two best known projects include the Sulman Award winning Badham House in Sydney's Cronulla and the Engineering Precinct at Sydney University. He was also responsible for the University of Melbourne master plan.

Early life

Mortlock was born in Lithgow on 14 October 1921. His father was an engineer at the local steel works, and died when Mortlock was still young. His mother moved the family to live with relatives in Sydney, in the harbour side suburb of Five Dock. Watching the local boat builders there fostered Mortlock's interest in design and construction. He built several boats while still at school.

During World War II, Mortlock traveled to Canada to train as a pilot with the Royal Canadian Air Force. He returned to Australia in 1945 in anticipation of service in the Pacific theatre - but the war ended before he could be posted for combat.

After leaving the air force he enrolled in the School of Architecture at the University of Sydney. There he studied under architect Leslie Wilkinson and the artist Lloyd Rees, who taught architectural history and freehand drawing.  During his studies Bryce met Sydney Ancher – one of the first Australian architects to embrace International style Modernism.  He started working with Ancher while still a student. Their partnership would span four decades, until Ancher's death in 1979.

Career

Mortlock graduated with first class honours in 1950, winning the University Medal and a travelling scholarship. This allowed him to work and study in Britain and Europe.  Upon his return, Mortlock and Stuart Murray took up full-time work with Sydney Ancher's firm in 1952.  Eight years later he won the Sulman Award for the Badham House at Cronulla. Bryce's design reflected the firm's adherence to the International style, while anticipating the so-called ‘Sydney Regional’ style with which the firm would become associated over the next decade.

After Ken Woolley joined them in 1964, Ancher and Mortlock set up offices in Ridge St, North Sydney, establishing the well-known Sydney firm Ancher, Mortlock and Woolley. The firm completed innovative designs for town houses and flats at Wollstonecraft and Cremorne.  Mortlock was also appointed Master Planner for the University of Melbourne in 1968.  It was a position that entailed regular trips from his Cammeray home, but one which he held until the late 1990s, describing it as his most satisfying and challenging.  The University recognized his work with an honorary doctorate.  In 1970 Mortlock, in partnership with others, applied his interest in planning and the need for increasing density to the drafting of a Building Code for North Sydney Council.

By that time Mortlock had been living locally for 40 years. He moved to Vernon Street, Cammeray, with his new wife Peggy in 1950, shortly after returning from overseas.  As two of the first residents of that area, the Mortlocks confronted the North Sydney Council who had begun clearing the bush land fronting Long Bay.  The Mortlocks managed to convince the Council to stop this destruction, and over the next four decades they cared for the public land near their home – tirelessly cutting the lantana and balloon vine that grew in the wake of the clearing. Eventually the Council came to embrace Mortlock's attitude to the preservation of the bush land. Bushcare Group networks were set up and Bryce himself became a local volunteer coordinator.

The Royal Australian Institute of Architects' (RAIA) National President Warren Kerr on Bryce Mortlock: "Bryce Mortlock was well-known for his energetic support of the architectural profession and the RAIA, and for his willingness to speak out on matters of importance, especially as they affected good design," Mr Kerr said. "The contributions he made as the RAIA’s NSW Chapter President from 1970-72 and RAIA National President from 1975-76 will long be remembered". "He was also widely known as a talented architect of the highest order, who justly received awards for his work on more than one continent."

Awards 
Mortlock was awarded the Alfred Bossom Medal
in London (1951); New South Wales's prestigious Sir John Sulman Medal (1960) and Merit Award (1972); the RAIA’s top
annual award, the RAIA Gold Medal (1979); the Queen's Jubilee Medal (1977); the RAIA Victorian Chapter
Bronze Medal (1981); an Honorary Doctorate from the University of Melbourne (1988); and a Member,
Order of Australia (1982). He was nominated as a Life Fellow of the RAIA in 1970.

Later years

Although he enjoyed a national reputation, Mortlock's passion for sensitive environmental relationships in urban design and practice was also recognised by his local community. He was a pioneer of what would become known as the Bushcare movement. In 1997 his efforts to preserve and regenerate bushland near his Cammeray home were commemorated with the renaming of the
Vernon Street Reserve, ‘Mortlock Reserve’ – an honour rarely accorded to a living person.

Mortlock died on 3 July 2004 at the Royal North Shore Hospital aged 82.

He had three sons with his wife Peggy.

References
 www.northsydney.nsw.gov.au/resources/documents/m3358_040712.pdf
 www.architecture.com.au/i-cms?page=5152
 uninews.unimelb.edu.au/news/1695/
 www.architecturemedia.com/aa/aaissue.php?issueid=200411&article=37&typeon=3

External links
 Australian Institute of Architects Website
 RAIA Canberra HQ designed by Bryce Mortlock
 Heritage Register for RAIA Canberra HQ designed by Bryce Mortlock
 Anchor Mortlock Woolley
 SMH Article by Richard Mortlock

Modernist architects
Modernist architecture in Australia
Associates of the Royal Institute of British Architects
1921 births
2004 deaths
Members of the Order of Australia
Recipients of the Royal Australian Institute of Architects’ Gold Medal